Walter Booth (December 8, 1791 – April 30, 1870) was a Major General, manufacturing Entrepreneur, and United States representative from Connecticut.

History
Walter was born in Woodbridge, Connecticut. He attended the common schools and settled in Meriden and engaged in manufacturing. Booth was active in the Connecticut Militia. He was a Colonel of the Tenth Regiment, Second Battalion of Militia from 1825 to 1827, Brigadier General in 1827 and 1828, and Major General of the First Division 1831-1834.

In 1833, he cofounded the Meriden National Bank, now the oldest of that city, with Silas Mix, Samuel Yale, 
Elisha Cowles, Stephen Taylor, Ashabel Griswold, James S. Brooks, Noah Pomeroy and John D. Reynolds, and formed the Board of Directors. He served as a judge of the county court in 1834. In 1836, he became President of the Meriden National Bank. He was a member of the Connecticut State House of Representatives in 1838. He was elected as a Free-Soiler to the Thirty-first Congress (March 4, 1849 – March 3, 1851). He was an unsuccessful candidate for reelection in 1850 to the Thirty-Second Congress.

He resumed his former manufacturing pursuits and died in Meriden, Connecticut in 1870. He was buried in East Cemetery.

References

External links

1791 births
1870 deaths
People from Woodbridge, Connecticut
Members of the United States House of Representatives from Connecticut
Members of the Connecticut House of Representatives
Connecticut Free Soilers
Free Soil Party members of the United States House of Representatives